Canoeing at the 2015 Southeast Asian Games was held at the Marina Channel, Singapore from 6 to 9 June 2015.

Participating nations
A total of 109 athletes from eight nations is being competing in canoeing at the 2015 Southeast Asian Games:

Competition schedule
The following is the competition schedule for the canoeing competitions:

Medalists

Men

Women

Medal table

References

External links